The parent article is at List of University of Michigan alumni

This is a list of arts-related alumni from the University of Michigan.

Art, architecture, and design
Benny Alba, artist, graduated in psychology
James Baird, civil engineer; directed the construction of the Flatiron Building, Lincoln Memorial, Arlington Memorial Amphitheater, and Tomb of the Unknown Soldier
Bill Barrett (BS 1958, MS, MFA), sculptor and painter
John W. F. Bennett, civil engineer; supervised the construction of the Algonquin Hotel in New York and the Ritz and Waldorf Hotels in London
Raymond Ward Bissell (BA 1958, PhD 1966), Professor of Art History Emeritus at the University of Michigan
Jonathan M. Bloom (MA 1975), Norma Jean Calderwood University Professor of Islamic and Asian Art at Boston College
Charles Correa (ARCH: B.Arch. 1953, Honorary Doctor of Architecture 1980)
John DeLorean (BUS: MBA 1957), GM Group Vice President; designer of the DeLorean
John Dinkeloo, civil engineer; partner of 1982 Pritzker Prize laureate Kevin Roche in the firm Roche-Dinkeloo
Alden B. Dow, architect; son of Herbert Henry Dow (founder of the Dow Chemical Company) and Grace A. Dow
Dan Dworsky (ARCH: B.Arch. 1950), designed the University's Crisler Arena and the Federal Reserve Bank in Los Angeles; member of varsity football starting team at Michigan, 1945–1948; played professionally for the Los Angeles Dons in 1949; member of Jewish Sports Hall of Fame; all-time 50-year Rose Bowl team
Tony Fadell (COE: BSE CompE 1991), "father of the Apple iPod"
Jesse Frohman (BA Economics), photographer
Mike Kelley (BFA 1976), gross-out artist in L.A. in the style of Paul McCarthy
Richard Keyes (SOAD: BA Design 1957), Professor Emeritus at Long Beach City College, after a 30-year career there teaching life drawing and painting
Charles L. Kuhn (BA 1923), Director of the Busch-Reisinger Museum at Harvard University
Maynard Lyndon (1907–1999), architect
Malcolm McCullough, U of M ARCH professor and author
Tristan Meinecke (c. 1942, did not graduate), painter, writer, architect.
Charles Willard Moore (ARCH: B.Arch 1947, Hon Arch D. 1992), designer of Lurie Tower on Michigan's North Campus; winner of the AIA Gold Medal in 1991
Robert Nickle (BA 1943), artist known primarily for his "street scrap" collage work; studied architecture and design at Michigan; worked and taught at the Art Institute of Chicago
Michele Oka Doner, American artist and writer. Stamps School of Art & Design: BFA, 1966; MFA, 1968, Alumna in Residence, 1990, Hon. Dr. Fine Arts, 2016.
Jason Polan, American artist and illustrator. Stamps School of Art & Design: BFA, 2004
Ralph Rapson, head of architecture at the University of Minnesota for many years; one of the world's oldest and most prolific practicing architects at his death at age 93
Warren M. Robbins (MFA), art collector whose collection led to the formation of the National Museum of African Art at the Smithsonian Institution
Bernard "Tony" Rosenthal (BA 1936), abstract sculptor
Alison Ruttan (BFA, Photography, 1976), American interdisciplinary artist and educator at the School of the Art Institute of Chicago
Eric Staller (BA 1971, Artist Architecture)
William A. Starrett, builder of the Empire State Building
Harold P. Stern (BA 1943, MA 1948, PhD 1959), Director of the Freer Gallery of Art
Marilyn Stokstad (PhD, 1957), Judith Harris Murphy Distinguished Professor of Art History Emeritus at the University of Kansas
Martha Tedeschi (MA, 1982), Elizabeth and John Moors Cabot Director of the Harvard Art Museums
Raoul Wallenberg (ARCH: B.Arch 1935), Swedish diplomat famous for assisting Hungarian Jews in late World War II; namesake of the Wallenberg Fellowship and Taubman College's Wallenberg Studio
Judd Winick (BA 1992 Drawing and Painting), cartoonist, screenwriter, author

Arts and entertainment

Alumni lives in film
 In 42, Harrison Ford plays Branch Rickey (J.D., 1911), the baseball manager who helped break baseball's color line by promoting the career of Jackie Robinson played by Chadwick Boseman.
 In The Bit Player John Hutton played Claude Shannon the father of information theory, celebrating the 2016 centenary of Shannon's birth 
 In Boardwalk Empire, Harry M. Daugherty the 51st United States Attorney is portrayed by Christopher McDonald
 In Capote, William Shawn, editor of The New Yorker was portrayed by Bob Balaban and in the 2012 film Hannah Arendt by Nicholas Woodeson.
 In Compulsion Nathan Leopold and Richard Loeb (Leopold and Loeb), who are played by Judd Steiner and Artie Strauss, attempt to commit the perfect murder. They are defended at trial by Clarence Darrow who also attended the University of Michigan
 In Driven, Lee Pace plays John DeLorean and portrays the development of his car and his legal entanglements
 In DeLorean (MBA 1957) is a documentary directed by Academy Award-winning filmmakers D. A. Pennebaker and Chris Hegedus. It chronicles John DeLorean throughout the launch of his DeLorean sports car in 1981.
 In The Devil in the White City, Leonardo DiCaprio will play Herman Webster Mudgett (MD 1884), one of the first documented serial killers.
 In  The Fab Five, Michigan's pathbreaking basketball recruiting class is depicted.
 In the 1998 HBO miniseries From the Earth to the Moon, Jerome Wiesner, former MIT president was portrayed by Al Franken.
 In Gifted Hands, Cuba Gooding plays neurosurgeon Ben Carson (M.D. 1977).
 In Gimme Danger, a Jim Jarmusch film, Iggy Pop (M.D.N.G.) plays himself, the front-man for The Stooges.
 In Harmon of Michigan, Tom Harmon (B.A. 1940), football player and athlete, plays himself.
 In I am alive today: History of an AIDS Drug, Jerome Horwitz, primary investigator for the AZT drug (used to treat AIDS) is featured.
 In Inherit the Wind, Spencer Tracy plays trial attorney and alumnus Clarence Darrow (M.D.N.G. 1878).
 In The Insider Mike Wallace was played by actor Christopher Plummer in the 1999 feature film. 
 In Jessye Norman: A Portrait, the life of opera singer Jessye Norman was documented.
 In Love, Gilda, the life of alumna and comedian Gilda Radner is documented. Radner was previously memorialized in another film Gilda Live, which is a 1980 American comedy documentary film starring Gilda Radner, directed by Mike Nichols and produced by Lorne Michaels.
 In Madonna: Truth or Dare, singer Madonna (M.D.N.G. 1977) plays herself.
 In Mike Wallace Is Here, the career of American journalist Mike Wallace is described. 
 In Arthur Miller: Writer (March 2018), HBO documentary the life of playwright Arthur Miller is Directed and narrated by his daughter Rebecca
 In Mozart and the Whale, Josh Hartnett plays autistic savant Jerry Newport (B.A.).
 In Night and the City (1992), The Great White Hype, and Rocky Balboa, Bert Sugar, plays himself (author, odds-maker, boxing aficionado). 
 In ShowBusiness: The Road to Broadway, Jeff Marx (and his parents) can be seen in the documentary film which followed the trajectories of four Tony-nominated musicals from 2004, Avenue Q, Wicked, Taboo and Caroline, or Change. Marx, along with filmmaker Dori Berinstein and actor Alan Cumming, provided the audio commentary for the documentary's DVD.
 In Spellbound (2002), Harry Altman plays himself, a contestant who goes on to earn a Ph.D. from Michigan in mathematics.
 In Spelling the Dream, Michigan graduate Nupur Lala's 1999 spelling bee victory is documented in this 2018 film; Ms. Lala also appeared as herself in Spellbound
 In Stargate: Continuum Some scenes were filmed on board  (SSN-757). The then-captain of the Alexandria, Commander Mike Bernacchi, played himself.
 In The Orchid Thief, Meryl Streep plays University of Michigan essayist Susan Orlean (B.A. 1976).
 In Tom vs Time an American documentary web television series created by Gotham Chopra was released from January 25 to March 12, 2018 on Facebook Watch. The six-episode series follows New England Patriots quarterback Tom Brady (B.G.S., 1999) 
 In The Trial of the Chicago 7, Tom Hayden was portrayed by Eddie Redmayne 
 In Unabomber: The True Story, Tobin Bell stars as Ted Kaczynski
 In You Don't Know Jack, Al Pacino plays Dr. Jack Kevorkian (M.D. 1952), an advocate for euthanasia.
 In Wallenberg: A Hero's Story, released in 1985, Richard Chamberlain plays Raoul Wallenberg. The 1990 Swedish production Good Evening, Mr. Wallenberg, featured Stellan Skarsgård

Dance
Nina Davuluri (BS 2011), first Indian American Miss America (Miss America 2014); first to perform a Bollywood dance on that pageant's stage
Janet Lilly, principal dancer for Bill T. Jones/Arnie Zane Dance Company
Sharmila Mukerjee is an Odissi Dancer and Choreographer, a disciple of Guru Kelucharan Mohapatra. 
Kapila Vatsyayan (born December 25, 1928) is a leading scholar of Indian classical dance, art, architecture, and art history.

Directors, producers, and screenwriters
Libby Appel, fourth artistic director of the Oregon Shakespeare Festival
Wyatt Bardouille (BS 1997), producer and director of Dominica: Charting a Future for Paradise
William J. Bell (March 6, 1927 – April 29, 2005) was an American screenwriter and television producer, best known as the creator of the soap operas Another World, The Young and the Restless and The Bold and the Beautiful.
Forman Brown (BA 1922), established Yale Puppeteers upon graduating; opened a puppet theatre in Los Angeles in the 1920s which attracted celebrity attention and support from Greta Garbo, Marie Dressler, Douglas Fairbanks, and Albert Einstein
David Callaham (BA 1999), screenwriter of Shang-Chi and the Legend of the Ten Rings
Hal Cooper (BA 1946), TV producer and director for Maude, Dick Van Dyke Show, Mayberry RFD, That Girl, I Dream of Jeannie, and Empty Nest
Valentine Davies (BA 1927), screenwriter of Miracle on 34th Street
Lillian Gallo (BA), 1978 winner of a Crystal Award, established in 1977 to honor outstanding women who have helped to expand the role of women within the entertainment industry
Megan Ganz (BA 2006), comedy writer; former associate editor of The Onion
Jon Glaser (BA), writer, comedian
Richard Glatzer, writer and director, Still Alice
Jonathan Glickman (BA 1991), producer of Rush Hour (franchise); former president, Motion Picture Group of Metro-Goldwyn-Mayer
Josh Greenfeld (1928–2018), author and screenwriter; known for screenplay for the 1974 film Harry and Tonto along with Paul Mazursky, which earned them an Academy Award nomination
Jon Hein (BA 1989), creator of the Jump the Shark website
Adam Herz (BA 1996), writer and producer of American Pie
Max Hodge (BA 1939), TV writer for Wild, Wild West, Mission Impossible, Marcus Welby, and The Waltons
Lawrence Kasdan (BA 1970, MA 1972), studied creative writing; won four Hopwood Awards; known for his work on The Empire Strikes Back, Return of the Jedi, and Raiders of the Lost Ark, The Force Awakens
Aviva Kempner (AB), director and screenwriter
Maryam Keshavarz (MA), filmmaker
Philip N. Krasne (BA 1927), producer of the later Charlie Chan films and the Cisco Kid series
David Levien (BA 1989), co-wrote and co-directed The Knockaround Guys; co-wrote Rounders
Jeff Marx (BA 1993), composer and lyricist of musicals; known for creating the Broadway musical Avenue Q with collaborator Robert Lopez; together, they wrote the show's 21 songs
Robert McKee (BA), creative writing instructor
Marcia Milgrom Dodge (BA 1977), director, choreographer, playwright, educator; Tony Award nominee for RAGTIME revival, 2010
David Newman (BA 1958, MA 1959), screenwriter for Superman I, II, III, Bonnie & Clyde, What's Up Doc? and Still of the Night
Leslie Newman (BA 1958), screenwriter for Superman
Dudley Nichols (MDNG: 1914–1917), screenwriter for For Whom the Bell Tolls, Stagecoach, the Oscar-winning The Informer, and Bringing up Baby
Benj Pasek and Justin Paul (BFAs 2007), musical theatre writing team
Kerri Pomarolli (BFA 1996), comedian
John Rich (BA 1948, MA 1949), Emmy Award-winning producer for Maude, That Girl, Mayberry RFD, and MacGyver
Norman Rosten (MA 1936), poet, playwright, novelist and Guggenheim award winner
Davy Rothbart, author; filmmaker; contributor to This American Life; editor and publisher of Found Magazine
Allen Rucker, writer and television producer
Robert Shaye (BUS: BBA 1960), founder and co-chairman of New Line Cinema; produced The Lord of the Rings trilogy
Ron Sproat (MA), creator of character Barnabas Collins in Dark Shadows
Roger L. Stevens (MDNG: 1928–1930, HLLD 1964), stage producer for West Side Story, Cat on a Hot Tin Roof, A Man for All Seasons, and Annie
Christopher Yost (BA 1995), screenwriter for Thor: Ragnarok, Cowboy Bebop and The Mandalorian

National Book Award
Kevin Boyle His 2004 book, Arc of Justice: A Saga of Race, Civil Rights, and Murder in the Jazz Age, won the National Book Award.
Howard Moss won the National Book Award in 1972 for Selected Poems.
Frank O'Hara The Collected Poems of Frank O'Hara, the first of several collections, shared the 1972 National Book Award for Poetry.
Theodore Roethke won the annual National Book Award for Poetry on two occasions: in 1959 for Words for the Wind,[2] and posthumously in 1965 for The Far Field.
Keith Waldrop won the National Book Award for Poetry for his 2009 collection Transcendental Studies: A Trilogy
Jesmyn Ward, won the 2011 National Book Award for Fiction for her second novel Salvage the Bones and the 2017 National Book Award for "Sing, Unburied, Sing". She is the only two-time female winner of the National Book award.
Gloria Whelan won the annual National Book Award for Young People's Literature in 2000 for the novel Homeless Bird.

National Medal of the Arts
James Earl Jones, 1992 recipient
Arthur Miller, 1993 recipient
Jessye Norman, 2009 recipient
Roger L. Stevens, 1988 recipient

Emmy Award

Collectively, 31 Michigan alumni have won 87 Emmy Awards.

James A. Baffico, winner of 2 Emmy Awards
Michael Bellavia, winner of an Emmy Award
Reg E. Cathey, winner of an Emmy Award
David Connell, winner of 5 Emmy Awards
Darren Criss, winner of an Emmy Award: Outstanding Lead Actor in a Limited Series or Movie ("The Assassination of Gianni Versace: American Crime Story")
Ann B. Davis, winner of 2 Emmy Awards
Paul Devlin (filmmaker) winner of 5 Emmy Awards
Neal Gabler, winner of an Emmy Award
Cathy Guisewite, winner of an Emmy Award
Sanjay Gupta, winner of an Emmy Award
Peter Hansen, winner of an Emmy Award
Gary Hutzel, winner of 4 Emmy Awards
James Earl Jones, winner of 8 Emmy Awards
Mick Kaczorowski, winner of 3 Emmy Awards
Christine Lahti, winner of 3 Emmy Awards
Joseph LoDuca, winner of 2 Emmy Awards
Jill Martin, winner of 4 Emmy Awards
Margo Martindale, winner of 3 Emmy Awards
Bob McGrath, received a life time achievement Emmy in 1990
Ari Melber (born March 31, 1980) is an American journalist for NBC News and host of MSNBC's The Beat with Ari Melber.
Arthur Miller, winner of 2 Emmy Awards
Marilyn Suzanne Miller, winner of 3 Emmy Awards
Gilda Radner, winner of 2 Emmy Awards
John Rich, winner of 3 Emmy Awards
Davy Rothbart, winner of an Emmy Award
Kurt Sayenga, winner of an Emmy Award
David Shuster, winner of an Emmy Award
Curt Sobel, winner of an Emmy Award
Mike Wallace, winner of 21 Emmy Awards
Don Was, winner of an Emmy Award
Beth Tanenhaus Winsten, winner of an Emmy Award

Golden Globe Award winners

Darren Criss, is an American actor, singer and songwriter who won in 2019. 
Gary Gilbert (born 1965), film producer and the founder and president of Gilbert Films
James Earl Jones (born 1931), actor; career has spanned more than 60 years
Jeff Levy-Hinte (a.k.a. Jeffrey Kusama-Hinte), film producer; President of Antidote International Films
Madonna (Madonna Louise Ciccone; born 1958), singer, songwriter, actress, and businesswoman
Pasek and Paul (Benj Pasek and Justin Paul), songwriting duo and composing team for musical theater, films, and television
Christine Lahti (born 1950), actress, filmmaker, two-time Golden Globe winner
John Rich (1925–2012), film and television director

Grammy Award winners

George Crumb (D.M.A.) (born 1929), composer of avant-garde music; winner of a Grammy and a Pulitzer prize
Chip Davis (B.A.) (born 1947), founder and leader of Mannheim Steamroller
John M. Eargle (M.A.) (1931–2007), Oscar and Grammy-winning audio engineer; musician
David Effron (B.A.), conductor and educator
Gabriela Lena Frank (D.M.A.) (born 1972), pianist and composer of contemporary classical music
Joe Henry (B.A.) (born 1960), singer-songwriter, guitarist, and producer; has released 13 studio albums and produced multiple recordings for other artists, including three Grammy Award-winning albums
Bob James (M.A.) (born 1939), multiple Grammy Award-winning jazz keyboardist, arranger, and record producer
James Earl Jones (born January 17, 1931), actor; career has spanned more than 60 years; has won three Grammys
Fred LaBour (M.A.) (born 1948), better known by his stage name Too Slim; Grammy award-winning musician, best known for his work with the Western swing musical and comedy group Riders in the Sky
Madonna (MDNG) (born 1958), singer, songwriter, actress, and businesswoman; referred to as the "Queen of Pop" since the 1980s; seven-time Grammy award winner
Jessye Norman (MUSIC: MMUS 1968; HSCD 1987), opera and concert singer and 4 time Grammy winner
Pasek and Paul, musical duo
Gilda Radner (1946–1989), comedian, actress, and one of seven original cast members of SNL
Christopher Rouse (University of Michigan fellow) (born 1949), composer
Jennifer Laura Thompson (B.F.A. 1991) is an American actress and singer.
Don Was (MDNG) (born 1952), musician, record producer and record executive; winner of three Grammy awards

Tony Award winners

Celia Keenan-Bolger (born January 26, 1978) is an American actress. She is perhaps best known for portraying Scout Finch in the successful play To Kill a Mockingbird
Gavin James Creel (born 1976), actor, singer, and songwriter; best known for his work in musical theatre; received a Tony Award for his performance as Cornelius Hackl in Hello, Dolly!
David Allen Grier for A Soldier's Play
Gregory Jbara (born 1961), film, television and stage actor, and singer
James Earl Jones (born 1931), actor; career has spanned more than 60 years
Michael L. Maguire (born 1955), actor, best known for his role as Enjolras in the original Broadway production of the musical Les Misérables; this role won him a Tony Award in 1987
Jeff Marx (born 1970), composer and lyricist of musicals; winner of two Tony Awards
Marian Ethel Mercer (1935–2011), actress and singer
Arthur Asher Miller (1915–2005), playwright, essayist, and figure in twentieth-century American theater
Jack O'Brien (born 1939), director, producer, writer and lyricist is a winner of three Tony Awards
Paul Osborn, playwright and screenwriter best known for writing the screen adaptation of East of Eden; won 1980 Tony award for best Broadway revival for his play about four sisters, Morning's at Seven, which originally opened on Broadway in 1939
Martin Pakledinaz (1953–2012), costume designer for stage and film; winner of two Tony Awards
Pasek and Paul, known together as Pasek and Paul, are an American songwriting duo and composing team for musical theater, films, and television
Jeffrey Seller (BA 1986), Broadway producer; three-time Tony Award winner for Best Musical (Rent 1996, Avenue Q 2004, and In the Heights 2008) and, most recently, Hamilton
James D. Stern, film and Broadway producer; won a 2003 Tony Award for Hairspray

Graphic arts

 Sid Meier (BS 1976), video game designer of over 60 titles, including the Civilization series, Pirates!, and Railroad Tycoon. Co-founder of MicroProse and Firaxis Games.
Lloyd Dangle (BFA 1983), cartoonist
Beth Lo (BA 1971), artist
Dwayne McDuffie (BA, MA), cartoonist and fantasy author
Allen "Al" Milgrom (BA 1972), comic book writer, penciller, inker and editor, primarily for Marvel Comics; known for ten-year run as editor of Marvel Fanfare; long involvement as writer, penciler, and inker on Peter Parker, the Spectacular Spider-Man; four-year tenure as West Coast Avengers penciller; and long stint as the inker of X-Factor
Jim Ottaviani (MA nuclear engineering), author of several comic books about the history of science; Two-Fisted Science: Stories About Scientists features biographical stories about Galileo Galilei, Isaac Newton, Niels Bohr, and Richard Feynman
Jason Rubin, video game director; comic book creator; Internet company founder; known for the Crash Bandicoot series of games
Sam Viviano (AB 1975), Art Director and cover illustrator for MAD magazine

Music

Music: Composers
Clarice Assad (MA), her master's thesis concerto was recorded by Nadja Salerno-Sonnenberg
Evan Chambers (PhD), composer, traditional Irish fiddler, and Professor of Composition at the University of Michigan
Stephen Chatman (DMA 1977), composer
Pius Cheung (Chinese name: 張 鈞 量) (PhD), marimbist and composer
Robert Cogan (BM 1951, MM 1952), music theorist, composer, teacher
Feist, Far East Movement and Natalia Kills; has co-written songs for Lady Gaga, t.A.T.u., Flipsyde, Tokio Hotel, Ai, Alexandra Burke and Colby O'Donis
Gabriela Lena Frank (DMA 2001), composer, Guggenheim award winner
Alexander Frey (BM, MM), conductor, pianist, organist, harpsichordist, composer
Jay Gorney (LS&A: BA 1917; LAW: 1919), composer, songwriter of "Brother, Can You Spare A Dime?"
Robert James (BA, MA), two-time Grammy Award-winning smooth jazz keyboardist, arranger and producer
Laura Karpman (BM), composer for film, television, video games, theater, and the concert hall; winner of 5 Emmy Awards.
Andrew Lippa (BA 1987), lyricist and composer
David T. Little, composer and drummer known for orchestral and operatic works
Normand Lockwood, composer; studied composition at U-M 1921–1924; winner of a Guggenheim award
George W. Meyer (PhD 1941), Tin Pan Alley songwriter; Guggenheim award winner
Frank Ticheli (MM 1983, DMA 1987), Professor of Composition at the University of Southern California
Thomas Tyra (MUSIC: PhD 1971), American composer, arranger, bandmaster, and music educator
Aleksandra Vrebalov (DMA 2002), Serbian composer
Julia Wolfe, composer

Music: Groups
The Arbors, 1960s pop group (all four members; group named after Ann Arbor, Michigan)
George Frayne (BFA, MFA), founder of music group Commander Cody
Ella Riot, band formed by Michigan undergraduates who coined "DanceThink" music
Nomo, band formed at U-M
Tally Hall, band named after a shopping plaza in Michigan

Music: Instrumentalists
Don Blum (BA 1994), drummer in the band The Von Bondies
Aaron Dworkin (MA 1998), violinist and music educator
Laurence Kaptain (DMA), symphonic cimbalom artist
Fred LaBour (MA), musician; instrumental in the spread of the "Paul is Dead" urban legend
Randy Napoleon (BFA 1999), jazz guitarist
Barbara Nissman (BM, MM, DMA); concert pianist known for her interpretations of the music of Ginastera and Prokofiev

Music: Educators and Musicologists
Judith Becker (BA, PhD), ethnomusicologist
Chalkdust, born Hollis Urban Lester Liverpool (PhD ethnomusicology), calypsonian from Trinidad and Tobago; ethnomusicologist at the University of the Virgin Islands
 James Kibbie (DMA 1981), concert organist, recording artist, Professor of Organ at U-M
Timothy McAllister (BM 95, MM 97, DMA, 2002), Grammy award-winning classical saxophonist; member of PRISM Quartet; current Professor of Saxophone at U-M
Daniel Bernard Roumain (PhD), composer and performer, the self-styled "Dred Violinist"
Norma Wendelburg, composer, pianist and academic teacher

Music: Producers
Joe Henry, singer, songwriter, music producer
Martin Kierszenbaum (also known as Cherry Cherry Boom Boom; "Kirschbaum" is German for cherry tree), head of A&R at Interscope Records; president of Interscope's subsidiary imprint Cherrytree Records; songwriter; producer; A&R for Lady Gaga, Sting, Keane, Tokio Hotel,
Felix Pappalardi, musician, record producer
Richard Perry (BA 1964), record producer
David Shayman, aka Disco D (BUS: BBA 2002), helped pioneer Detroit booty music and later named it "ghettotech"; producer of hip-hop, R&B, and dancehall tracks
Sam Valenti IV (BA 2000), founded independent record label Ghostly International in 1999
David Was (David Weiss, BA 1974), musician and producer, Was (Not Was); music critic and commentator
Don Was (Don Fagenson, MDNG: 1970–1971), record producer; Blue Note Records president and musician, Was (Not Was)
Jack Yellen (BA 1913), lyricist and screenwriter; two of his most recognized songs are "Happy Days Are Here Again" and "Ain't She Sweet"; ASCAP board of directors (1951–69); Songwriters Hall of Fame 1972

Music: Vocalists
Becky Baeling Lythgoe (BFA), singer, actress, producer
Chris Bathgate (BFA), indie folk singer-songwriter and musician in the Ann Arbor and Ypsilanti folk music scene in Michigan
Janai Brugger (MM), operatic soprano
Michelle Chamuel (BA 2008), singer, songwriter, producer
Muriel Costa-Greenspon (AB, MA), mezzo-soprano who performed with the New York City Opera for thirty years; a daughter of deaf parents
David Daniels (MM 1992), countertenor
Joe Dassin (PhD), French singer
Michael Fabiano (BM 2005), operatic tenor
Elizabeth Fischer Monastero (BM 1956), operatic mezzo-soprano, voice teacher
Theo Katzman (BA 2008), singer, songwriter, producer
Holden Madagame, American transgender, opera singer tenor
Madonna, born Madonna Ciccone (MDNG: 1976–1978), singer and actress
Niagara, musician; painter; lead vocalist of the punk rock bands Destroy All Monsters and Dark Carnival
Sean Panikkar (BM, MM), opera singer; member of the classical crossover group Forte Tenors
Nicholas Phan, tenor, performer of oratorio and opera
Iggy Pop, born James Osterberg, Jr. (MDNG: 1963–1964), rock star
Ashley Putnam, (BM 1974, MM 1975), opera and concert singer
Antwaun Stanley, singer, songwriter
Vienna Teng, born Cynthia Yih Shih, Taiwanese American pianist and singer-songwriter; albums include Waking Hour (2002), Warm Strangers (2004), Dreaming Through The Noise (2006), and Inland Territory (2009); live album, The Moment Always Vanishing (2009), on which she is double-billed with her percussionist, Alex Wong
Dick Valentine (BA 1994), singer of Electric Six
Sachal Vasandani, jazz vocalist

Academy Award nominees and winners

John Briley (BA 1951, MA 1952), won Academy Award For Best Original Screenplay, Gandhi
Valentine Davies Miracle on 34th Street earned him an Academy Award for Best Story in 1947
Charles Crawford Davis (COE: 1916), won 1948 Oscar for his invention of the Davis Drive System, a system for merging sound with pictures and driving the film through movie cameras and projectors
Michael Dunn (MDNG), nominated for Best Supporting Actor in 1966 for Ship of Fools
John M. Eargle (MM 1954), Oscar and Grammy-winning audio engineer; musician (piano, church and theater organ)
Michael Epstein (BArch); also winner of two George Foster Peabody Awards, an Emmy, and a Writers Guild Award
Gary Gilbert (BBA), The Kids Are All Right (nominated for Best Picture); producer; founder and president of Gilbert Films
 James Earl Jones (BFA 1955), actor; the voice of Darth Vader in the Star Wars movies; winner of two Tony Awards and an honorary Oscar
Lawrence Edward "Larry" Kasdan (MA), The Big Chill (nominated, screenplay), Grand Canyon (nominated, screenplay), The Accidental Tourist (nominated, screenplay; Best Picture); Grand Canyon won the Golden Bear at the 42nd Berlin International Film Festival.
 Christine Lahti (BFA 1972), actress; winner of the Academy Award, an Emmy, and two Golden Globe awards
Kurt Luedtke, Out of Africa (winner – Writing Adapted Screenplay)
Arthur Miller (BA 1938), nominated for The Crucible; the play was adapted for film twice, by Jean-Paul Sartre as the 1957 film Les Sorcières de Salem and by Miller himself as the 1996 film The Crucible; his adaptation earned him an Academy Award nomination for Best Screenplay based on Previously Produced Material, his only nomination
John Nelson, Academy Awards for Best Visual Effects for Gladiator and Blade Runner 2049
Dudley Nichols, nominated for Best Screenplay for The Long Voyage Home in 1941, for Best Original Screenplay for Air Force in 1944, and for Best Story and Screenplay (Written Directly for the Screen) for The Tin Star in 1958; he won Best Screenplay for The Informer in 1936, but initially refused the honor due to an ongoing writer's strike
Pasek and Paul Benj Pasek and Justin Paul, known together as Pasek and Paul, are an Academy and Tony Award-winning American songwriting duo and composing team for musical theater, films, and television

Talent management
George Finkel (BA 1958), TV sports producer for NBC Sports 1971–1990; won three Emmy awards
Dan Glickman (BA 1966), President and CEO of the Motion Picture Association of America, Inc.

Theatre, film, and television 
Stanley Bahorek (BFA 2003), actor
Rick Bayless, chef who specializes in modern interpretations of traditional Mexican cuisine; known for PBS series Mexico: One Plate at a Time
 Michael Bellavia (BS 1991), Emmy Award- winning President of Animax Entertainment
 Selma Blair (BA 1994), actress, known for Cruel Intentions and Legally Blonde
Zachary Booth (BFA 2004), actor
 Sophina Brown (BFA), actor, Numb3rs
David Burtka (BFA 1997), actor; chef; entertainment news correspondent for E! News
Bruno Campos (LAW), Brazilian-born actor, Nip/Tuck
 Jessica Cauffiel (SMTD: BFA), actress
 Esther K. Chae (MA), actress
 Darren Criss (BFA 2009), actor; singer-songwriter; cast member of Glee; member of StarKid Productions
 Ann B. Davis (BFA 1948), two-time Emmy award winner, played the secretary in The Bob Cummings Show and Alice Nelson on The Brady Bunch
Donald Alan "Don" Diamond (BA 1942), radio, film, and television actor; known for his comic portrayal as Crazy Cat on the 1960s television sitcom F Troop
Erin Dilly, actress; Truly Scrumptious in the 2005 musical Chitty Chitty Bang Bang, for which she was nominated for a Tony Award and the Outer Critics Circle Award
 Michael Dunn, aka Gary Neil Miller (MDNG), actor, known for his recurring role as mad scientist Dr. Miguelito Loveless in the 1960s TV series The Wild Wild West
Barrett Foa (BFA 1999), actor, NCIS: Los Angeles
 Hunter Foster (BFA 1992), Tony Award-nominated actor
Stephen Fung Tak-Lun (BA 1992), Hong Kong-based actor, singer, model, writer and film director
 Alexander Gemignani, actor, tenor
 David Alan Grier (BA 1978), actor, comedian
 Erika Henningsen (BFA 2014), Broadway actress, known for originating the role of Cady Heron in Mean Girls
 Avery Hopwood (AB 1905), one of the most successful playwrights of the Jazz Age
 Ruth Hussey, actress
Stephanie Izard (BA), chef; winner of the fourth season of Top Chef, Bravo's cooking competition show
 Gregory Jbara (MDNG: 1979–1981), Tony award-winning actor
 Tusshar Kapoor (BBA), actor in Indian cinema
 Andrew Keenan-Bolger (BFA 2007), known for the role of Crutchy in Disney's Newsies, as well as for his video blog, "Andrew's Blog"
 Celia Keenan-Bolger (BFA 2007), Broadway actress who originated the role of Olive Ostrovsky in The 25th Annual Putnam County Spelling Bee; Éponine in the revival of Les Misérables
 Nancy Kovack, film and TV actress; attended U-M at age 15 and graduated by 19; appeared on Star Trek and Bewitched; in 1969 she was nominated for an Emmy for an appearance on Mannix
 Ethan Laidlaw, actor
 Mark Lenard, actor, including several Star Trek movies
 Matt Letscher (BA 1992), film and TV actor; The Mask of Zorro
 Lucy Liu (BFA 1990), actress, known for Ally McBeal, Elementary and for the movie versions of Charlie's Angels
 Taylor Louderman, Broadway actress, known for originating roles Campbell in Bring It On: The Musical and Regina George in Mean Girls the Musical
 Strother Martin (BA 1947), actor, member of the diving team
Margo Martindale, film, stage and television actress; Emmy Award winner
 Bob McGrath (1954), actor, singer, and writer; "Bob" from PBS' Sesame Street
Mark Metcalf (BA 1968), actor in television and film
 Eric Millegan, Bones
Emily Morse (born 1970), sex therapist, author, and media personality
Sydney Morton, played a recurring character in Spike Lee's She's Gotta Have It.
Michael O'Brien, writer Saturday Night Live 2009–2015, cast member 2013–14 
Beverley Owen (née Ogg, sometimes credited as Beverly Owen), known for having played Marilyn Munster
 Eren Ozker (1970), puppeteer and Muppet performer
 Ashley Park (BFA 2013), Broadway actress known for her work in The King and I and for originating the role of Gretchen Wieners in Mean Girls
 Rob Paulsen class of 1975, actor (attended 1975 only)
 David Paymer (BA 1975), character actor, Carpool, Get Shorty
 Jean Peters, actress
 Gilda Radner (BA 1970), actress and comedian, known for her work on Saturday Night Live for which she won an Emmy in 1978
 Ted Raimi (BA 1983), actor, seaQuest DSV and Xena: Warrior Princess
 William Russ, actor; the father on Boy Meets World
Ellen Sandweiss (MA in Theatre Management), B-movie actress; has performed in musical theatre as a dancer and pop singer, and in a one-woman show of Jewish music
 Martha Scott (BA 1934), actress, Our Town (Academy Award nomination), The Ten Commandments, Ben Hur
Miriam Shor (BFA), film, stage, and television actress
Douglas Sills, actor
Randy and Jason Sklar, professionally known as the Sklar Brothers, identical twin comedians
StarKid Productions, the cast and creators of YouTube sensation, A Very Potter Musical
 Jennifer Laura Thompson (BFA 1991), Tony Award-nominated actress, played Glinda in the Broadway musical Wicked
Carlos Valdes (SMTD BA 2011), actor and musician, The Flash
 Kapila Vatsyayan (MA), Indian arts scholar; founder and director of Indira Kalakendra
James Wolk (BFA 2007), actor, Front of the Class, The Crazy Ones
 Mike Weinberg (BFA 2015), actor, Life as a House,  Home Alone 4

Writers of fiction, poetry, and nonfiction
Daniel Aaron (BA 1933), author of many articles and books, including Men of Good Hope: A Story of American Progressives, The Unwritten War: Writers of the Civil War and, with Richard Hofstadter and William Miller, The Structure of American History
Megan Abbott (BA), author of crime fiction and of a non-fiction analysis of hardboiled crime fiction; Mystery Writers of America Edgar Allan Poe Award in 2008 for Queenpin
Saladin Ahmed (BA), Arab-American science fiction and fantasy writer and poet
Uwem Akpan (MFA 2007), Nigerian author; Jesuit priest; won Commonwealth Writers' Prize for Best First Book and the PEN/Beyond Margins Award for Say You're One of Them 
Jennifer Allison (BA), author of mystery novels and the Gilda Joyce children's series
Olive San Louie Anderson, author of An American Girl, and Her Four Years in a Boys’ College
Max Apple (BA 1963), author of The Oranging of America (1976, short stories), Zip: A Novel of the Left and the Right (1978, novel), Three Stories (1983, short stories), Free Agents (1984, novel), The Propheteers: A Novel (1987, novel), and Roommates: My Grandfather's Story (1994, biography of his grandfather)
Robert Arthur, Jr. (BA 1930), writer, novelist, editor; created "The Three Investigators" mystery series for young readers and worked on the anthology TV series Alfred Hitchcock Presents
Robert Asprin (MDNG: 1964–1965), science fiction and fantasy author
Brit Bennett (MFA 2014), author of The Mothers (2016)
Kevin Boyle (PhD), author; professor of history; his 2004 book, Arc of Justice: A Saga of Race, Civil Rights, and Murder in the Jazz Age, won the National Book Award
Sven Birkerts (AB 1973), essayist and author of The Gutenberg Elegies, and son of emeritus faculty member Gunnar Birkerts
Martha Arnold Boughton (Ph.B. 1880), poet, biographer, song music and lyrics
Philip Breitmeyer (AB 1947), wrote Lightning Ridge! Further Adventures of Butch Cassidy and the Sundance Kid
Michael Byers (MFA), writer
John Malcolm Brinnin (BA 1942), Canadian-born American poet and literary critic
Juliet Winters Carpenter (BA, MA 1976), translator of Japanese, author
Meg Waite Clayton (LAW: JD), The Language of Light was a finalist for Barbara Kingsolver's Bellwether Prize; The Wednesday Sisters became a national bestseller and a book club favorite
James Oliver "Jim" Curwood (MDNG: 1899–1900), action-adventure writer and conservationist
Jose Y. Dalisay Jr. (MFA 1988), Filipino writer
Underwood Dudley (PhD 1965), known for his popular writing about crank mathematics
Elizabeth Ehrlich, wrote Miriam's Kitchen
Neal Gabler (LAW: JD) author of An Empire of Their Own: How the Jews Invented Hollywood (1989), Winchell: Gossip, Power, and the Culture of Celebrity (1994), Life the Movie: How Entertainment Conquered Reality (1998), and Walt Disney: Triumph of the American Imagination (2006)
Mary Gaitskill, author of Bad Behavior (1988), Two Girls, Fat and Thin (1991), Because They Wanted To (1997) (stories), Veronica (2005)
Frank Bunker Gilbreth Jr. (AB 1933), wrote Cheaper by the Dozen
Connie Glaser (MA), author, speaker, and columnist on the topics of women's leadership and communications
Josh Greenfeld, novelist, playwright, screenwriter, author of A Child Called Noah trilogy
Judith Guest (BA 1959), wrote Ordinary People, later turned into an Academy Award-winning film
Cathy Guisewite (BA 1972), author, creator of Cathy comic strip
Aaron Hamburger (BA 1995), writer; his short story collection The View from Stalin's Head (2004) was awarded the Rome Prize by the American Academy of Arts and Letters and the American Academy in Rome; his novel Faith for Beginners (2005) was nominated for a Lambda Literary Award
Gabrielle Hamilton (MFA), owner and manager of Prune restaurant in Manhattan; author of Blood Bones and Butter; recipient of the James Beard award for best chef
Steve Hamilton (AB 1983), wrote Blood is the Sky, an Alex McKnight mystery; his 1999 novel A Cold Day in Paradise won an Edgar Award; his 2010 novel The Lock Artist won an Edgar for Best Novel; one of only five authors to win the award twice
Robert Hayden (MA 1944), Professor of Poetry 1969–1980
Raelynn Hillhouse (HHRS: MA, PhD 1993), author of spy novels; national security expert; blogger (The Spy Who Billed Me); political scientist
Matthew Hittinger (MFA 2004), author of the poetry collection Skin Shift (2012), and the chapbook Pear Slip (2007); winner of the Spire Press 2006 Chapbook Award
Jessica Hollander (BA 2004), author of Katherine Anne Porter Prize winning story collection In These Times the Home is a Tired Place (2013) and the chapbook Mythical Places (2019) Sonders Press
James Avery Hopwood (AB 1905), playwright, established the U-M Hopwood Awards; one of the premier playwrights of the jazz age; at one time had four plays running simultaneously on Broadway
James Hynes, novelist
Randa Jarrar, Palestinian-American novelist, short story writer, and translator
Ruth Ward Kahn (BA, 1889), author, lecturer
Laura Kasischke (MFA 1987), author and Guggenheim award winner, In a Perfect World, Suspicious River, White Bird in a Blizzard, The Life Before Her Eyes, Boy Heaven, Be Mine, Feathered
Jane Kenyon (BA 1970, MA 1972), poet and wife of former Michigan professor Donald Hall, U.S. Poet Laureate
Elizabeth Kostova (MFA 2004), writer; her first novel, The Historian, was published in 2005, and has become a best-seller
Kathryn Lasky (BA 1966), children's author and nonfiction writer
Daniel Lyons (MFA 1992), writer; senior editor at Forbes magazine; writer at Newsweek; editor of ReadWrite
Ross Macdonald (MA 1942, PhD 1952), wrote the Lew Archer mystery series
Janet Malcolm, 1955, writer for The New Yorker; wrote In the Freud Archives
Sebastian Matthews (MFA), poet and writer
Thomas McGuane (MDNG), novelist
Richelle Mead (BA), bestselling fantasy author
Brad Meltzer (BA 1992), wrote The Zero Game, The Tenth Justice, Dead Even, The First Counsel, and The Millionaires; creator of TV series Jack and Bobby
 Walter Miller (MA 1844), classics scholar; first to translate the Iliad into English in the native dactylic hexameter
 Sara Moulton (BA 1974), author of Sara Moulton Cooks at Home, Sara's Secrets for Weeknight Meals, and Sara Moulton's Everyday Family Dinners
Nami Mun (MFA), Korean American novelist and short story writer
Davi Napoleon (AB 1966, AM 1968), wrote Chelsea on the Edge: The Adventures of an American Theater
Heather Neff, (BA 1978), African American novelist and professor
Bich Minh Nguyen (MFA), novelist; American Book Award for Short Girls
Frank O’Hara (MA 1951); author of A City Winter and Other Poems, Oranges: 12 Pastorals, Second Avenue, Odes, Lunch Poems, Love Poems
Patrick O'Keeffe (MFA), winner of the Hopwood Program's Chamberlain Award for Creative Writing for Above the Bar; instructor in U-M's Sweetland Writing Center; won the 2006 Story Prize for The Hill Road; won 2006 Whiting Writers Award
Susan Olasky (AB 1975), author
Susan Orlean (AB 1976), wrote The Orchid Thief, made into the movie Adaptation
John Patric (attended 1924–25), wrote for National Geographic and Reader's Digest in the 1930s and 1940s
Otto Penzler, editor of mystery fiction; proprietor of The Mysterious Bookshop in New York City
Marge Piercy (AB 1957), wrote Braided Lives and Fly Away Home; Hopwood Program award winner
Elwood Reid, novelist and short story writer
Kathryn Reiss (MFA), award-winning author of children's and young adult fiction
Paisley Rekdal (MFA), poet
Emma Winner Rogers (Litt. B. 1891), writer, speaker, suffragist
Matthew Rohrer (BA), poet and Hopwood Award winner
Ari Roth, playwright and artistic director of Theater J
Kristen Roupenian (MFA), author of You Know You Want This: "Cat Person" and Other Stories
Preeta Samarasan (MFA 2006), wrote Evening is the Whole Day
Ruth L. Schwartz (MFA 14985), poet
Allen Seager, author, Amos Berry and A Frieze of Girls
William Shawn (MDNG: 1925–1927), The New Yorker editor 1952–1987
Porter Shreve (MFA), author; professor of English and Director of the Creative Writing Program at Purdue University
Danez Smith (MFA 2017), poet
John Sinclair (BA 1964), poet, one-time manager of the band MC5
Hubert Skidmore, had written six novels by the time he was 30, including Hawk's Nest; married to Maritta Wolff
Betty Smith (1921–22, 1927, 1931), author of A Tree Grows in Brooklyn
Iehiro Tokugawa (born 7 February 1965) is an author, translator, and the heir of the main Tokugawa house. 
Robert Traver, pen name of John D. Voelker (JD 1928), wrote Anatomy of a Murder
Jia Tolentino (MFA 2015), staff writer for The New Yorker and formerly deputy editor of Jezebel and contributing editor at The Hairpin.
David Treuer (PhD 1999), writer
Chris Van Allsburg (BA 1972), author and illustrator; best known for Jumanji and The Polar Express, both made into films
Jesmyn Ward (MFA 2005), author of Where the Line Bleeds (2008); Salvage the Bones (2011); Men We Reaped (2013); and Sing, Unburied, Sing (2017)
Edmund White (AB 1962), writer for Vanity Fair and The New Yorker
Stewart Edward White (PhD 1895, MA 1903), author
Nancy Willard (BA, PhD), 1982 Newbery Medal for A Visit to William Blake's Inn
Maritta Wolff (BA 1940), author of Whistle Stop, called by Sinclair Lewis "the most important novel of the year;" also wroteAbout Lyddy Thomas (1947), Back of Town (1952), The Big Nickelodeon (1956) and Buttonwood (1962)
Sarah Zettel (BA), science fiction, fantasy, and mystery author

See also
Hopwood Program

References

External links
University of Michigan Alumni
Alumni association of the University of Michigan

University of Michigan arts alumni
Arts